IUPUI Gymnasium, nicknamed the Jungle, is a 1,215-seat multi-purpose arena on the campus of Indiana University – Purdue University Indianapolis (IUPUI) in Indianapolis. From 1982 until 2014 it was home to the IUPUI Jaguars men's basketball team, and continues to host the IUPUI women's basketball and volleyball teams. It also holds various sports classes for the Indiana University School of Physical Education.

External links
IUPUI Gymnasium

IUPUI Jaguars basketball
College basketball venues in the United States
Sports venues in Indianapolis
Indoor arenas in Indiana
Basketball venues in Indiana
Volleyball venues in Indiana
College volleyball venues in the United States